Claea dabryi is a species of stone loach endemic to the Jinshajiang river basin in China.

References

Nemacheilidae
Freshwater fish of China
Monotypic fish genera